Darker Than Night is a 2014 Mexican horror film and a remake of the 1975 original. The movie is the first 3D Mexican horror film and it tells the story of an eccentric old woman who dies and leaves her opulent mansion to her niece, Greta.

Plot
Greta is a beautiful young woman whose eccentric aunt dies leaving her a large, once opulent mansion. When Greta moves in with her friends she discovers that she must take care of her aunt’s prized black cat, Beker. The new residents take charge of the mansion, throwing wild parties and enjoying a fun filled summer until they lose track of Beker – who drowns in the mansion’s pool. What was about to be the best summer of their lives quickly turns into a spine-chilling fight for their lives.

Cast
 Zuria Vega as Greta
 Adriana Louvier as Maria
 Eréndira Ibarra as Pilar
 Ona Casamiquela as Vicky
 José María Torre as Pedro
 Miguel Rodarte as Actuacion especial Loco
 Margarita Sanz as Evangelina
 Lucía Guilmáin as Tia Ofelia
 Hernán Mendoza as Garcia
 Daniel Villar as Prometido Tia

Release
Darker Than Night opened theatrically in the United States on 26 September 2014 and earned $539,867 in its opening weekend, ranking number 17 at the box office. At the end of its run, it had grossed $870,063 domestically and $5,221,000 overseas for a worldwide total of $6,091,063.

References

External links
 
 
 

2014 films
2014 horror films
Mexican horror films
2010s Spanish-language films
Horror film remakes
Films shot in Mexico
Films set in country houses
Remakes of Mexican films
2010s Mexican films